Enkyō Pat O'Hara is a Soto priest and teacher in the Harada-Yasutani lineage of Zen Buddhism.

Biography
Growing up as a young white girl in Tijuana, Mexico while attending Catholic School in the United States, O’Hara was far too familiar with racism and prejudice. With one foot in each world, racial slurs and comments that were made to her left her feeling ostracized and insecure. However it wasn’t until her high school years when she discovered and entered the Beat Generation and took to reading various literatures including poems by Gary Snyder who gave way to new ways of thought. It also in her high school years when she read R.H. Blyth’s translations of Haiku, Buddhist sutras, and writings of D.T. Suzuki that the door to Zen Buddhism opened, her attraction being Zen’s artistic expression.

O'Hara studied with John Daido Loori but differences with her teacher led her to begin studying with Taizan Maezumi, who himself was Loori's teacher. However it was when she began studying under Taizan Maezumi Roshi when she felt like she found her true teacher and main influencer. It was their shared love of freedom, new experiences, dharma, and love of empowering women that made O’Hara feel a strong connection, often referring to his teaching as feminine. It was with him that she began to study the Soto and Rinzai traditions.

O'Hara was ordained a Soto priest by Hakuyu Taizan Maezumi in 1995 and received shiho from Bernard Glassman in 1997. In June 2004 Glassman gave O'Hara inka.

She is abbot and founder of the Village Zendo in New York City. She serves as co-spiritual director of the Zen Peacemaker Order along with Tetsugen Bernard Glassman. She is also a former professor of interactive media at New York University's Tisch School of the Arts. She holds a doctorate in Media ecology. A socially engaged Buddhist, she is a member of the White Plum Asanga and manages the Buddhist AIDS Network.

Activism
Much of Enkyo's activism is in the world of HIV/AIDS, from teaching meditation to HIV-positive practitioners to working on prevention strategies among those at risk, and serving as Chairperson of the Board of the National AIDS Interfaith Network. Enkyo, who is a lesbian, has articulated a Zen Buddhist approach to issues dealing with sexuality, race, class, and health.

Bibliography

Gallery

See also
Buddhism in the United States
Buddhism and sexual orientation
Timeline of Zen Buddhism in the United States

References

External links

Year of birth missing (living people)
Place of birth missing (living people)
Living people
HIV/AIDS activists
American Zen Buddhists
Women Buddhist priests
American lesbian writers
LGBT Buddhists
LGBT clergy
Rinzai Buddhists
Soto Zen Buddhists
White Plum Asanga
Zen Buddhist priests
New York University faculty
Lesbian academics
American women academics
21st-century American women writers